Railroad House is a historic home located at Sanford, Lee County, North Carolina. It was built in 1872, and is a -story, three bay, board-and-batten, Gothic Revival style frame cottage.  The gable roof has wide overhanging eaves and "rafter brackets."  It has a one-story rear wing, a single central interior chimney in the main block, and an exterior end chimney at the rear of the wing. It was built by the Raleigh and Augusta Air Line Railroad for the depot agent. The house was moved to its present site in October 1962, across the street from its original location.  The building is operated by the Railroad House Historical Association as a museum.

It was listed on the National Register of Historic Places in 1973.  It is located in the Downtown Sanford Historic District.

References

External links
Railroad House

Historic house museums in North Carolina
Houses on the National Register of Historic Places in North Carolina
Gothic Revival architecture in North Carolina
Houses completed in 1872
Houses in Lee County, North Carolina
National Register of Historic Places in Lee County, North Carolina
Museums in Lee County, North Carolina
Individually listed contributing properties to historic districts on the National Register in North Carolina